In theoretical linguistics, underspecification is a phenomenon in which certain features are omitted in underlying representations. Restricted underspecification theory holds that features should only be underspecified if their values are predictable. For example, in most dialects of English, all front vowels are unrounded. It is not necessary for these phonemes to include the distinctive feature [−round], because all  [−back] vowels are [−round] vowels, so the roundness feature is not distinctive for front vowels.  Radical underspecification theory, on the other hand, also allows for traditionally binary features to be specified for only one value, where it is assumed that every segment not specified for that value has the other value.  For example, instead of the features [+voice] and [−voice], only [+voice] is specified and voicelessness is taken as the default.

The concept of underspecification is also used in morphological theory, particularly to refer to cases in which a morpheme does not bear an entire set of feature-values, and is thus compatible with a wide range of potential morphological environments. In this approach to morphology, for example, while the English pronouns he vs. she are specified for gender, the plural pronoun they would be underspecified for gender.

Example of underspecification in phonology
In Tuvan, phonemic vowels are specified with the articulatory features of tongue height, backness, and lip rounding. The archiphoneme /I/ is an underspecified high vowel where only the tongue height is specified.

{| cellpadding="4"
|-
! allophone/archiphoneme
! height
! backness
! roundedness
|-
| /I/
| high
| ___
| ___
|-
| 
| high
| front
| unrounded
|-
| 
| high
| front
| rounded
|-
| 
| high
| back
| unrounded
|-
| 
| high
| back
| rounded
|}

Whether /I/ is pronounced as front or back and whether rounded or unrounded depends on vowel harmony. This can be seen in the following words:

{| cellpadding="4"
|-
| /-Im/
|
|
| 'my'
| (the vowel of this suffix is specified only for tongue height)
|-
| /idikIm/
| →
| 
| 'my boot'
| ( is front and unrounded)
|-
| /kyʃIm/
| →
| 
| 'my strength'
| is front and rounded) 
|-
| /xarIm/
| →
| 
| 'my snow'
| ( is back and unrounded)
|-
| /nomIm/
| →
| 
| 'my book'
| ( is back and rounded)
|}

Underspecification in morphology 
Underspecification in morphology uses feature decomposition to create abstract, binary features that allow for the creation of natural classes in relation to morphology.

In German, there are three classes of gender. These are feminine, masculine, and neuter. 

From this breakdown of German gender features, underspecification theory derives the following definitions of gender using a cross classification of the gender features [±masc] and [±fem].

In the underspecification theory, the dative singular marker -em is characterized by an underspecified gender marking ([-fem]). This would allow for a single morphological exponent to be referred to by one set of underspecified features. Take for example, the determiner dem, which can occur in masculine and neuter contexts in the dative singular. By allowing the underspecification of the feminine feature, dem is free to appear in both the masculine and neuter contexts, but not the feminine context. This contrasts the traditional view, in which there are two separate but homophonous forms of dem, in which dem1 contains the full gender specification [-fem, +masc] and dem2 contains the full gender specification [-fem, - masc].

See also

Bibliography

References

Grammar
Structuralism

nl:Onderspecificatie